Richard, Richie or Dick Power may refer to:

Peers and politicians
 Richard Power, 1st Baron Power (c.1482–1539), Irish peer (Earl of Tyrone#Barons Power (13 September 1535))
 Richard Power, 4th Baron Power (c.1553–1607), Irish peer (Earl of Tyrone#Barons Power (13 September 1535))
 Richard Power, 1st Earl of Tyrone (1630–1690)
 Richard Power (of Clashmore) (c.1747–1814), Irish peer; MP for County Waterford
 Richard Shapland Power (c.1776–1831), Irish legislator; MP for County Waterford; his father was Richard Power of Clashmore
 Sir Richard Champion Power, 3rd Baronet (1843–1892), Irish peer, member of Power baronets
 Richard Power (Parnellite MP) (1851–1891), Irish nationalist politician, MP for Waterford City 1874–1891

Others
 Dick Power (before 1903–after 1938), boxer
 Richie Power Snr (born 1957), Irish hurler
 Richie Power Jnr (born 1985), Irish hurler
 Richard Power (writer) (1928–1970), Irish writer
 Richard Power (cricketer) (1896–1978), Irish cricketer

See also
 Richard Powers (disambiguation)
 Power (name)